Sanno Shinto was a syncretic shinto group with elements from Tendai buddhism. It began in the early Edo Period. It no longer exists
Tendai doctrine allowed Japanese Buddhists to reconcile Buddhist teachings with the native religious beliefs and practices of Japan (now labeled "Shinto"). In the case of Shinto, the difficulty is the reconciliation of the pantheon of Japanese gods (kami), as well as with the myriad spirits associated with places, shrines or objects, with Buddhist teachings. These gods and spirits were initially seen as local protectors of Buddhism.

Sannō Shintō 山王神道 was a specifically Tendai branch of sryncretic Buddhist-Shinto religious practice, which revered kamis called the Mountain Kings (Sannō) or Sanno Sansei 山王ニ聖 (The Three Sacred [Deities] of Sanno) and was based on Hie Taisha 日吉大社 a shrine on Mount Hiei. The Togakushi Shrine (戸隠神社, Togakushi Jinja) was also associated with the Tendai school before it was separated from Buddhist institutions by the Japanese state during the separation of Shinto from Buddhism in the 19th century.

These religious ideas eventually led to the development of a Japanese current of thought called honji suijaku (本地垂迹), which argued that kami are simply local manifestations (the suijaku or "traces") of the Buddhas (honji, "true nature"). This manifestation of the Buddhas was explained through the classic Mahayana doctrines of skillful means and the Trikaya.

References 

Shinto denominations